Charles Arthur Bowsher (May 30, 1931September 30, 2022) was an American businessman and politician. He served as the 6th Comptroller General of the United States from 1981 to 1996. During that period, he led the Government Accountability Office in addressing the savings and loan crisis and other major issues. He also served as the 5th Assistant Secretary of the Navy (Financial Management and Comptroller) during the Lyndon B. Johnson administration from 1967 to 1971.

Early life
Bowsher was born in Elkhart, Indiana, on May 30, 1931.  His father worked as an engineer for the New York Central Railroad.  Bowsher attended public schools in his hometown and in Chicago.  He studied accounting at the University of Illinois at Urbana–Champaign, graduating with a bachelor's degree in 1953.  He then joined the United States Army and served for two years, before obtaining a Master of Business Administration from the University of Chicago School of Business in 1956.

Career
After graduating, Bowsher first worked for Arthur Andersen & Co. starting in 1956.  While at the firm, he played a crucial role in its efforts to encourage public discussion on the need for sound financial reporting within the public sector.  From 1967 to 1971, Bowsher served as Assistant Secretary of the Navy (Financial Management and Comptroller).  He oversaw a budget of over $20 billion a year, 4,500 staff in the accounting department, and 500 individuals in internal audit.  He went back to Arthur Andersen after four years in the role and assumed an executive position.  He was also responsible for looking after the firm's work for various federal agencies, such as the Department of the Interior, the Agency for International Development, and the Federal Reserve.

Comptroller General
Bowsher was nominated to serve as United States Comptroller General by President Ronald Reagan in July 1981, succeeding Elmer B. Staats.  During his tenure, he was subject of the lawsuit Bowsher v. Synar, which led to the U.S. Supreme Court striking down the Gramm-Rudman-Hollings Act of 1986.  He was known for his visible role during the savings and loan crisis when he addressed the Government Accountability Office.  He was especially critical of manoeuvres by the US Congress to reduce oversight of the savings and loans industry, stating that "this is a huge scandal and to a large extent it was allowed to grow because of the way this town does business".

Bowsher was instrumental in Congress' passage of the Single Audit Act of 1984, which required annual audits for state and local governments.  He also played a key role in the passing of the Chief Financial Officers' Act of 1990, requiring federal department and agencies to prepare financial statements and undergo annual financial audits.

Later life
Bowsher was inducted into the Accounting Hall of Fame in 1996, along with William Henry Beaver and Donald James Kirk.

Bowsher later served as the Secretary-Treasurer/Budget Chairman for the Board of Directors of the Concord Coalition. He also served on the board of directors of the Committee for a Responsible Federal Budget.

Personal life
Bowsher married Mary Mahoney in 1963.  They met while he was working for Arthur Andersen, and they remained married for 59 years until his death.  Together, they had two children.

Bowsher died on September 30, 2022, at home in Bethesda, Maryland.  He was 91 years old.

References

External links
Biography at SI International, where he is currently a director
Induction into Accounting Hall of Fame
Biography at Accounting Hall of Fame 

1931 births
2022 deaths
Comptrollers General of the United States
Reagan administration personnel
United States Assistant Secretaries of the Navy
People from Elkhart, Indiana